Ján Andrej Cully (born 9 December 1995) is a Slovak racing cyclist, who currently rides for UCI Continental team .

Major results
2017
 2nd Overall Grand Prix Chantal Biya
1st  Young rider classification
1st Stage 1
2018
 4th Time trial, National Road Championships
 4th Overall Grand Prix Chantal Biya
 7th Overall Tour du Cameroun
2019
 1st  Time trial, National Road Championships
 1st Stage 4 Tour de Serbie
 5th Overall In The Steps of Romans
1st Stage 2 
 9th Grand Prix Velo Erciyes
 10th GP Slovakia
2020
 1st  Time trial, National Road Championships
 4th Overall In the footsteps of the Romans

References

External links

1995 births
Living people
Slovak male cyclists
Place of birth missing (living people)
European Games competitors for Slovakia
Cyclists at the 2019 European Games